Llanfynydd is a village, parish and community in Carmarthenshire, Wales. The community population at the 2011 census was 499. It lies some 10 miles (16 km) north-east of the county town, Carmarthen. Bordering it are the communities of Llansawel, Talley, Manordeilo and Salem, Llangathen, Llanegwad and Llanfihangel Rhos-y-Corn, all in Carmarthenshire.

Heritage
The Church in Wales parish church is a Grade II* listed building dedicated to St Egwad, a 7th-century bishop in Wales. The tower, probably the earliest part, dates from about 1400. The north aisle was added in the 16th century. The building was restored in 1861, when further windows were added. The only indication of a previous church further up the valley is in the name of a farm: Bryn-Yr-Eglwys ("Hill of the Church").

In 1844 Llanfynydd was a parish of 11,000 acres and 1,358 inhabitants in Cathinog Hundred. By 1929 the population was down to 581.

Worship
Parish registers exist from 1692. The parish also has several chapels.

Education
D. Jones, a local clergyman, established a day school in Llanfynydd in 1738, for 20 children.

The number of pupils at the school had fallen to 11 by September 2013, with a deficit of £50,000, and Carmarthenshire Council warned that the school would close if numbers fell below 10.

However, in December 2014 the BBC reported that the school, though it had no pupils, could not be closed until Carmarthenshire County Council had held a consultation and a vote on the issue.

Public protest
In July 2004, in protest over plans to erect a wind farm nearby, the residents of Llanfynydd renamed their village Llanhyfryddawellehynafolybarcudprindanfygythiadtrienusyllafnauole
("lovely silent church, ancient place of the rare kite under wretched threat from misplaced blades") for the space of one week.

The name was chosen to reflect villagers' concern that the wind farm would threaten three endangered species of bird – the (red kite, the curlew, and the skylark) – and to generate publicity for their cause by being longer than the previously longest place name in the UK: that of Llanfairpwllgwyngyllgogerychwyrndrobwllllantysiliogogogoch in Anglesey.

The protest went ahead despite assurances from the local council and from the Spanish-owned developers Gamesa Energy UK (part of Gamesa Corporación Tecnológica) that the single wind turbine planned was intended merely as a test to see how suitable the area might be for wind turbines in the future.

Notable people
 John Dyer (1699–1757), a painter and Welsh poet who became a priest in the Church of England
 Thomas Rees (1815–1885), Congregational minister and historian of nonconformity, was born at Pen Pontbren, Llanfynydd; twice elected to chair the Union of Welsh Independents.

References

External links

Church website
Historical information on GENUKI
Photographs of Llanfynydd and surrounding area on Geograph
A Vision of Britain through Time - Llanfynydd

Communities in Carmarthenshire
Villages in Carmarthenshire